Banana Pi is a line of  single-board computers produced by the Chinese company Shenzhen SINOVOIP Co., Ltd. , its spin-off Guangdong BiPai Technology Co., Ltd.  and supported by Hon Hai Technology (Foxconn).

The hardware design of the Banana Pi computer model was influenced by the Raspberry Pi and both lines use the same 40 pin I/O connector. 

Banana Pi also can run NetBSD, Android, Ubuntu, Debian, Arch Linux, Raspberry Pi OS operating systems, though the CPU complies with the requirements of the Debian armhf port.  Most models use a MediaTek or Allwinner SoC (system on chip) with two or four ARM Cortex cores.

Series and generations

Banana Pi BPI-M1 

The Banana Pi BPI-M1 is a single-board computer featuring a Allwinner dual-core SoC at 1 GHz, 1GB of DDR3 SDRAM, Gigabit Ethernet, SATA, USB, and HDMI connections, and built-in 3.7V Li-ion battery charging circuit. It can run a variety of operating systems including Android, Lubuntu, Ubuntu, Debian, and Raspberry Pi OS.

Key Features:
 Allwinner A20 Dual-core 1.0 GHz CPU
 Mali-400 MP2 with Open GL ES 2.0/1.1.
 1 GB DDR3 memory.
 1x SATA interface.
 1x Gigabit LAN 
 1x USB otg and 2x USB 2.0
 1X MIC
 Composite video out
 HDMI out
 IR 
 CSI camera interface
 DSI display interface
 26 PIN GPIO

BPI official Wiki Banana Pi BPI-M1 wiki page

Neither Banana Pi nor Shenzhen SINOVOIP Co., Ltd. have a direct relationship to the Raspberry Pi Foundation, though its similarities are clear. "Linux User & Developer" does not consider it a "direct clone, but a considerable evolution," whilst linux.com similarly sees it as a clone with improved performance.  The board layout is very similar to the Raspberry Pi board, though it is about 10% larger and the relative spacing of some connectors varies. Not all Raspberry Pi accessories will fit as a result.

Banana Pi BPI-M1+ 

The Banana BPI-M1+ is a credit-card-sized and low-power single-board computer.

Note:
 The Banana Pi M1+ (Plus) Board BPI wiki page Banana Pi BPI-M1+ (Plus) wiki Page

Banana Pi BPI-M2 

The Banana Pi M2 (BPI-M2) is a credit card-sized and low-power single-board computer. It is a quad core version of Banana Pi, and supports on board Wi-Fi. The Banana Pi M2 series runs Android, Debian, Ubuntu, Raspberry Pi images and other images.

Banana PI M2 hardware: 1Ghz ARM7 quad-core processor, 1GB DDR3 SDRAM, Gigabit ethernet port.

The Banana PI M2 is the same size as the Banana Pi M1. It supports 1080p video output, and the GPIO is compatible with Raspberry Pi B+.

Note:
 Since June 2017, BPI-M2 is the first product that stopped production in Banana PI series. Allwinner A31S chip stopped production since 2016, and the company ran out of stock of the chip.
 The Banana Pi M2 Board detailed document on Banana Pi M2 Gitbook Page

Banana Pi BPI-M2+ (BPI-M2 Plus) 

The Banana PI BPI-M2+ was released in April 2016. It has an Allwinner H3 SoC with a quad-core CPU and an on-board Wi-Fi module.

It runs Android, Debian, Ubuntu, and Raspberry Pi OS images for the Raspberry Pi. Banana Pi PBI-M2 hardware: 1Ghz ARM7 quad-core processor, 1GB DDR3 SDRAM, 8GB eMMC flash on board, and SDIO Wi-Fi module on board.

Note:
 The Banana Pi M2+ (Plus) Board BPI wiki page Banana Pi M2+ (Plus) wiki Page

Banana Pi BPI-M2 Zero 

The Banana Pi BPI-M2 Zero is a low-power single-board computer featuring a high-performance Allwinner quad-core SoC at 1.2 GHz, 512MB of DDR3 SDRAM, USB, Wi-Fi, Bluetooth and mini HDMI.

The BPI-M2 Zero PCB is the same size as the Raspberry Pi Zero W PCB, but it has extra parts on the back, so it may or may not fit Raspberry Pi Zero W cases depending on their exact dimensions.

Key Features
 CPU: Allwinner H2+, Quad-core Cortex-A7.
 512MB DDR3 SDRAM.
 Wi-Fi (AP6212) & Bluetooth on board.
 Mini HDMI.
 40 PIN GPIO, It includes UART, SPI, I2C, IO etc.

The Banana Pi has the same GPIO headers as the Raspberry Pi 1 Model A & B, as seen below.

 The Banana Pi BPI-M2 Zero Board BPI wiki page Banana Pi BPI-M2 Zero wiki Page

Banana Pi BPI-M2 Ultra 

Banana PI BPI-M2 Ultra (BPI-M2U) is an open source hardware platform, it uses Allwinner R40 system-on-chip, it supports Wi-Fi+BT on board, and supports SATA interface on board.

Banana PI PBI-M2 Ultra hardware: Quad Core ARM Cortex-A7, ARMv7 CPU, 2GB DDR3 SDRAM, 8GB eMMC flash on board, Gigabit Ethernet port, built-in 3.7V Li-ion battery charging circuit.

It can run Android smoothly, it supports 1080P video, and the 40 pin GPIO header is pin-compatible with the Raspberry Pi.

Note:
 The Banana Pi M2 Ultra Board BPI wiki page Banana Pi M2 (Ultra) wiki Page
 using a 3.5" HDD may require external power source for the disk; on-board power can not provide enough current.

Banana Pi BPI-M2 Berry 

Banana PI BPI-M2 Berry (BPI-M2B) is an open source hardware platform, it uses Allwinner V40 system-on-chip and it supports Wi-Fi and Bluetooth on board.

Banana PI M2 Berry hardware: 32 Bit Quad Core ARM Cortex-A7 1.2 GHz CPU, 1GB DDR3 SDRAM, No eMMC, Gigabit Ethernet port.

Banana PI M2 Berry series can run Android, Debian, Ubuntu, Raspberry Pi OS and other OS. It can run Android when resolution is under HD or GPU is not needed.

Since R40 and V40 chips are pin-to-pin compatible, they can be swapped in BPI-M2 Ultra and BPI-M2 Berry versions resulting in two hybrid products.

Note:
 The Banana Pi M2 (Berry) Board BPI wiki page:Banana Pi M2 (Berry) wiki Page

Banana Pi BPI-M2 Magic 

Banana PI BPI-M2 Magic (BPI-M2M) is a single-board computer designed for internet-of-things applications, It uses Allwinner R16 System on a Chip, also can use Allwinner A33 chip on board, it can be used for home entertainment, home automation, and high wireless performance, etc.

Note:
1. BPI-M2 Magic not HDMI interface.
2. Does not support RJ45 interface.
 The Banana Pi M2 (Magic) Board BPI wiki: Banana Pi BPI-M2 Magic wiki Page

Banana Pi BPI-M3 

Banana Pi M3 is an open source hardware platform, it is an octa-core version of Banana Pi, it supports onboard Wi-Fi and SATA Port. Banana Pi M3 is able to run Android 5.1.1, Debian, Ubuntu, Raspberry Pi and other OS.

Banana PI M3 hardware: 2Ghz ARM7 octa-core processor, 2GB LPDDR3 SDRAM, Gigabit ethernet port and the GPIO is compatible with Raspberry Pi B+.

Note:
 The Banana Pi M3 Board BPI wiki page: Banana Pi M3 wiki Page
 The Banana Pi M3 Board detailed document on Banana Pi M3 Gitbook Page

Banana Pi BPI-M4 
Banana Pi BPI-M4 uses the Realtek RTD1395 System on a Chip. It features 1 GB of RAM and 8 GB eMMC. It also has onboard Wi-Fi for 802.11b/g/n/ac and BT 4.2. On the ports side, the BPI-M4 has 4 USB 2.0 ports, 1 USB Type C port, 1 HDMI port, 1 audio jack. Supports M.2 Key E PCIE 2.0 interface.

The RTD1395 is equipped with a high-performance quad-core CPU, ARM cortex-A53, with 512K L2 cache embedded. the RTD1395 also integrates the ARM Mali-470 Graphic Processing Unit (GPU) to accelerate 2D and 3D graphics processing. For acceleration of this OSD and 2K user interface, the built-in Streaming Engine of the RTD1395 provides commonly used drawing functions. the CPU is dedicated to applications, while most of the functions of the RTD1395 is dedicated to manipulating, decoding video streams in various formats.e.g. decoding 4Kx2K H.265, Full HD MPEG1/2/4/H.264/H.264 MVC, AVC/VC-1, VP8, VP9, AVS, AVS plus, HD JPEG, etc. Video DSP can also handle encoding of up to Full HD with H.264 format. Video decoding and encoding can run simultaneously.

Note:
 The Banana Pi M4 Board BPI wiki page : Banana Pi M4 wiki Page

Banana Pi BPI-M64 

Note:
 The Banana Pi M64 Board BPI wiki page : Banana Pi M64 wiki Page

Banana Pi BPI-F2 

Banana Pi BPI-F2 uses the Freescale i.MX6 System on a Chip. i.MX6 with ARM Cortex-A9 MPCore 4×CPU processor (with TrustZone), this is the first Banana Pi board design with a Freescale SoC.

Note:
 The Banana Pi BPI-F2 BPI wiki page : Banana Pi BPI-F2 wiki Page

Banana Pi BPI-P2 Zero 

The Banana Pi BPI-P2 Zero is a low-power single-board computer featuring a high-performance Allwinner quad-core SoC at 1.2 GHz, 512 MB of DDR3 SDRAM, USB, Wi-Fi, Bluetooth and mini HDMI.

Key Features:

 CPU: Allwinner H2+, Quad-core Cortex-A7.
 512 MB DDR3 SDRAM.
 Wi-Fi (AP6212) & Bluetooth on board.
 Mini HDMI.
 40 PIN GPIO, including UART, SPI, I2C, IO etc.
 10/100 Ethernet
 IEEE 802.3af PoE standard PoE module support
 8GB eMMC flash on board.

There are just 3 differences from the BPI-M2 Zero. The rest of the hardware design is the same as the BPI-M2 Zero, so all the software is the same.
 added 8 GB eMMC flash memory on board, which can be used as an IoT gateway.
 BPI-P2 Zero with 10/100 Ethernet interface, BPI-M2 Zero with PIN define for 10/100 Ethernet, usage is the same.
 PoE function support on board.

 The Banana Pi BPI-P2 Zero Board BPI wiki page Banana Pi BPI-P2 Zero wiki Page
 BPI-P2 Zero PoE module wiki :BPI-9600 IEEE  802.3af PoE module

Banana Pi BPI-S64 core 

Banana Pi BPI-S64 core uses the Actions S700 System on a Chip. S700 SoC with ARM Cortex-A53 Quad-Core CPU, Mali450 MP4 GPU. BPI-S64 core with 2GB LPDDR3 and 8GB eMMC flash on board.

BPI-S64 core modules are small enough to fit all kinds of hardware. In addition, S64 core also provides I/O boards with GPIO ports, as well as USB, Micro USB, CSI, DSI, HDMI, and MicroSD and many other interfaces.

BPI-S64 core development kit spec

Note:
 The Banana Pi S64 core Board BPI wiki page : Banana Pi S64 core wiki Page

Banana Pi BPI-R1 

The Banana Pi R1 is a 300Mbit/s Wireless 802.11n Router with both wired and wireless network connections is designed specifically for smart home networking use. With 2T2R MIMO technology and two detachable antennas, the R1 is a dual core system that runs smoothly with Android 4.2.2 and has five Gigabit ethernet ports, SATA socket, supports games and 1080p high definition video output.

Note:
 The Banana Pi R1 Board BPI wiki page: Banana Pi R1 wiki Page
 The Banana Pi R1 Board detailed document on Banana Pi R1 Gitbook Page

Banana Pi BPI-R2 

Banana PI BPI-R2 is a highly integrated multimedia network router; it can be used for high wireless performance, home entertainment, home automation, etc. BPI-R2 integrates a Quad-code ARM Cortex-A7 MPcore operating up to 1.3 GHz, The Router also includes a variety of peripherals, including HDMI TX, MIPI DSI, PCIe2.0, USB2.0 OTG, USB3.0 Port, SATA port，5 Gbit/s Port Gigabit Ethernet port, 802.11a/b/g/n Wi-Fi & BT4.1 on board, also supports 802.11ac/n WLAN connection through mini PCI-e port BPI-R2can run with Android 5.1 smoothly, while as of the time of this entry this board does not work properly with any known linux distribution. The size of Banana Pi BPI-R2 same as BPI-R1, it can easily run with games as it supports 1080p high definition video output.

Note:
 The Banana Pi R2 Board BPI wiki page: Banana Pi R2 wiki Page

Banana Pi BPI-R64 

Banana PI BPI-R64 is a highly integrated multimedia network router; it can be used for high wireless performance, home entertainment, home automation, etc. The Banana Pi R64 is a router based development board, which can run on a variety of open source operating systems including OpenWRT and Linux. It has 4 Gigabit LAN ports, 1 Gigabit WAN, and AC Wi-Fi AP function.

Key Features
 MediaTek MT7622, 1.35GHZ 64 bit dual-core ARM Cortex-A53
 1GB DDR3 SDRAM
 Mini PCIE interface supports 4G module
 built-in 4x4n 802.11n/Bluetooth 5.0 system-on-chip
 MediaTek MTK7615 4x4ac Wi-Fi on board
 supports 1 SATA interface
 MicroSD slot supports up to 256GB expansion
 8GB eMMC flash (option 16/32/64G)
 5 port 10/100/1000 Mb Ethernet port
 (1) USB 3.0
 Slow I/O:ADC, Audio Amplifier, GPIO, I2C, I2S, IR, PMIC I/F, PWM, RTC, SPI, UART
 POE function support

Note:
 The Banana Pi BPI-R64 Board BPI wiki page: Banana Pi BPI-R64 wiki Page
 BPI-R64 PoE module wiki page: BPI-7402 IEEE 802.3at PoE module

Banana Pi BPI-W2 

The Banana PI BPI-W2 is a highly integrated multimedia network router; it can be used for high wireless performance, home entertainment, home automation, etc.

The BPI-W2 integrates a quad-core ARM Cortex-A53 MPcore operating up to 1.5 GHz. The Router also includes a variety of peripherals, including HDMI RX/TX, Mini DP, PCIe2.0, PCIe1.1 & SDIO, M.2 interface, USB2.0, USB3.0 Port, SATA port，2 Gbit/s Gigabit Ethernet port; it also supports a 802.11ac/n WLAN connection thru a PCI-e port.

The BPI-W2 can run with Android 6.0 smoothly, and also can run OpenWRT, Debian, Raspberry Pi OS and other OSes. The size of the Banana Pi BPI-W2 is the same as the BPI-R2, and can easily run with 1080P high-definition video output.  The GPIO is compatible with the Raspberry Pi 3.

Note:
 The Banana Pi w2 Board BPI wiki page : Banana Pi BPI-W2 wiki Page

Banana Pi BPI-D1 

The BPI-D1 is one of the smallest open-source development boards currently on the market, with a built-in HD mini camera. At 36mm (w) x36mm (l) and weighing in at 10g, it is claimed to be much smaller than other boards with comparable features. The board is specially suited to mini-cam applications, providing high-resolution image quality: both video and still capture at 1280x720p with a video capture rate of 30 fps.

The Banana Pi-D1 is designed to provide a set of multimedia tools in one small package, that can be run from an external battery source.

The features of the D1 include: HD mini-cam, audio sensor, microphone, CPU, GPIO, and Wi-Fi.

Note:
 The Banana Pi D1 Board documentation: Banana Pi D1 Gitbook Page

Banana Pi BPI-G1 
Banana Pi-G1 is an integrated IEEE 802.11 b/g/n (Wi-Fi wireless network), IEEE 802.15.4 (Zigbee), IEEE 802.11-2007 Standard (Bluetooth Low Energy 4.0) development board. All three wireless protocols can be used together, you can exchange any different transport protocols, and each wireless protocol is supported by its own single-chip SOC, which can facilitate Internet of Things (IoT) projects.

The Wi-Fi uses TI CC3200, which is a high-performance ARM Cortex-M4 wireless SOC, internally integrated TCP/IP protocol stack. This allows simple connection to the Internet using the BSD Socket.

The Zigbee uses TI CC2530, which integrates wireless capabilities and enhanced 8051 core SOC. After years of improvement, it is quite mature and stable. TI's Z-stack has achieved Zigbee 2007/Pro, you can use the 16's short address, you can use the 64-bit long address communication, face large local interconnect systems, providing advanced security encryption and mesh network structure support.

The Bluetooth 4.0 (BLE) uses TI CC2540/1, an integrated BLE stack and enhanced 8051 core, low-power wireless SOC. At present, most mobile phones have support for Bluetooth 4.0, both as a wearable device, or mobile interactive accessories, CC2540 can be easily completed. Meanwhile, BPI G1 also incorporates a high-performance STM32 ARM Cortex-M3 microcontroller, which help in dealing with time-consuming data or transit, the three wireless SOC coordinated.

Therefore, the Banana Pi G1 supports a wide range of Internet of Things DIY wireless projects.

Note:
 The Banana Pi G1 Board detailed document on Banana Pi G1 Gitbook Page

Powered by AXP209 power management unit, Banana Pi is able to output up to 1.6A, which means users can drive an external HDD without an extra power supply.

The Banana Pi board is similar to Cubieboard2.

Banana Pi Pro 

The Banana Pi Pro is a credit card-sized and low-power single-board computer developed in China by the LeMaker Team, with the goal of promoting STEM (science, technology, engineering and mathematics) education in schools.

Like its smaller sibling the Banana Pi, the Pro concept is heavily influenced by the Raspberry Pi, however the Banana Pro provides various enhancements over prior designs.

The Banana Pro has an Allwinner A20 system on a chip (SoC), which includes an ARM Cortex-A7 Dual-core (ARMv7-A) 1 GHz, Mali-400 MP2 GPU and 1GB DDR3 SDRAM.

The Banana Pro uses a microSD card for booting an OS, but also includes a SATA 2.0 interface to allow connection of a hard disk for additional storage, however you cannot boot from the hard disk.

Other differences from the Banana Pi include on-board Wi-Fi 802.11b/g/n AP6181, integrated composite video and audio output into a 3.5 mm TRRS jack. This makes space for a 40-pin extension header.

Specifications

Software

Operating systems 

 Android 4.2.2 & 4.4 for Banana Pi (Linux kernel 3.4.39+, 4.4 doesn't support Wi-Fi and has many bugs, 4.2.2 doesn't support all apps in Korea)
 Arch Linux for Banana Pi (Linux kernel 3.4.103; 2014-12-26)
 Armbian stable, with more kernel options, Debian or Ubuntu userland (3.4.113, 4.9.7, 4.11.0; 5.5.2017)
 Bananian Linux  (Debian based; Linux kernel 3.4.111; 2016-04-23)
 CentOS 7 
 Fedora for Banana Pi (Linux kernel 3.4.103; 2014-12-26)
 Kali Linux for Banana Pi (Linux kernel 3.4.103)
 Kano for Banana Pi (Linux kernel 3.4.103)
 Lubuntu for Banana Pi (Linux kernel 3.4.103; 2014-12-26)
 NetBSD
 OpenMediaVault
 OpenWrt
 openSUSE for Banana Pi (openSUSE v1412; Linux kernel 3.4.103; 2014-12-26)
 Raspbian for Banana Pi (Linux kernel 3.4.103; 2014-12-26)
 ROKOS for Banana Pi (Linux kernel 3.4.103; 2014-12-26)
 Scratch for Banana Pi (Boot to Scratch directly) (Linux kernel 3.4.103)

See also 
 List of open-source hardware projects

References

External links 
 
 
 Official forum
 Official wiki

ARM-based single-board computers
Educational hardware
Linux-based devices
Microcontrollers